The Little Deputy is a Canadian short documentary film, directed by Trevor Anderson and starring Luke Oswald, released in 2015.

Synopsis 
This short film blurs documentary and fiction as Anderson re-creates a photograph taken with his father at a West Edmonton Mall photography business while wearing western garb when he was a child in the 1980s. Using the visual tropes of dramatic reenactments seen in documentaries, the photographer initially mistakes young Anderson (played by Luke Oswald) for a girl and offers him a red dress to wear. He corrects the photographer, worried about the consequences of wearing the dress, and ends up wearing a child-sized deputy costume, which he is shown wearing in the real-life photo that inspired the creation of this film.

The second act of The Little Deputy manifests Anderson's childhood wish to wear the red gown. Filmed at Fort Edmonton, Anderson lives his childhood fantasy, wearing a red gown created custom for the director/actor, designed by Nicole Bach-Lebrecque and created by Joanna Johnston, to re-take the photograph.

Cast

Awards
The film premiered at the 2015 Sundance Film Festival.

At the Alberta Film and Television Awards in 2015, The Little Deputy won the Rosie Award for Best Short Film. In December 2015, it was named to the Toronto International Film Festival's annual Canada's Top Ten list of the year's ten best feature and short films.

The film was a shortlisted Canadian Screen Award nominee for Best Short Documentary Film at the 4th Canadian Screen Awards.

References

External links

2015 films
Canadian short documentary films
Canadian LGBT-related short films
2015 LGBT-related films
2015 short documentary films
Documentary films about gay men
Films shot in Edmonton
Films set in Edmonton
Autobiographical documentary films
2010s English-language films
2010s Canadian films
Films directed by Trevor Anderson